is a Japanese manga series written and illustrated by Ryoko Fukuyama. It has been serialized in Hakusensha's shōjo manga magazine Hana to Yume since September 2019, with its chapters collected into ten tankōbon volumes as of February 2023. A television drama adaptation aired from April to June 2022.

Characters

Media

Manga
As of February 2023, ten tankōbon volumes have been released.

Volume list

Drama
In March 2022, a television drama adaptation was announced, starring So Okuno, Rintarō Mizusawa, Eito Konishi, and Maito Fujioka. The series is directed by Junta Yamaguchi, Ayuta Yoshikawa, and Miyako Yasojima. The screenplay is written by Natsu Hashimoto, Tomohiro Ōtoshi, and Ruri Hyōdō. Yūdai Minami and Junpei Sakurada serve as the series' producers. It aired on ABC and TV Asahi from April 17 to June 19, 2022. Kana-Boon performed the theme song "Merry-Go-Round".

Reception
In 2021, Koi ni Mudaguchi was nominated for the seventh Next Manga Awards in the Best Printed Manga category.

References

External links
  

2022 Japanese television series debuts
2022 Japanese television series endings
Hakusensha manga
Manga adapted into television series
Romantic comedy anime and manga
Shōjo manga